Ponerorchis cucullata, formerly Neottianthe cucullata, is a species of flowering plant in the family Orchidaceae, native to temperate Eurasia from Poland to Japan, and also to the Himalayas. It is terrestrial, growing from tubers, to a height of up to 30 cm, with pinkish flowers arranged in a one-sided spike. It was placed in several different genera before a study in 2014 showed that it belonged in an expanded Ponerorchis.

Description
Ponerorchis cucullata grows from more or less ellipsoid tubers. It reaches a height of around 10–30 cm. It has two basal leaves, 5–7 cm long by 1.5–3 cm wide. One or two smaller bract-like leaves occur further up the stem. The pinkish flowers are arranged in a one-sided spike. The lip or labellum is 7–9 mm long and is deeply divided into three lobes, the middle lobe being the longest. The sepals and lateral petals are about 1 mm shorter than the labellum, and together form a "hood". A spur is present, about 6 mm long, slightly expanded at the tip. The viscidia are not enclosed in a "sac" or bursicle.

Taxonomy
The species was first described by Carl Linnaeus in 1753 as Orchis cucullata. It was subsequently transferred to a number of genera, including Gymnadenia and Habenaria, before being placed in Neottianthe in 1919. A molecular phylogenetic study in 2014 found that species of Neottianthe, Amitostigma  and Ponerorchis were mixed together in a single clade, making none of the three genera monophyletic as then circumscribed. Neottianthe and Amitostigma were subsumed into Ponerorchis, with this species becoming Ponerorchis cucullata.

Distribution
Ponerorchis cucullata has a very wide distribution in temperate regions of Eurasia. In Europe, it is native to Poland and Eastern Europe. In Asia, it is found in Siberia, the Russian Far East, Mongolia, China, Japan and Korea. It is also found in the Himalayas including Nepal.

References

External links 
 

cucullata
Flora of China
Flora of East Himalaya
Flora of Eastern Europe
Flora of Japan
Flora of Korea
Flora of Mongolia
Flora of Nepal
Flora of Poland
Flora of Siberia
Flora of the Russian Far East
Flora of West Himalaya
Plants described in 1753
Taxa named by Carl Linnaeus